The White Place Historic District is a residential historic district in Bloomington, Illinois. The district includes houses on White Place, North Clinton Boulevard, and Fell Avenue bordered to the south by Empire Street (U.S. Route 9) and Emerson Street to the north. These houses were largely built between 1895 and 1928, and many of them were built shortly after S. R. White platted White Place. The homes in the district were designed in a variety of architectural styles; styles prominently featured in the district include Prairie School, American Craftsman, Colonial Revival, Victorian, and Spanish Colonial.

The district was added to the National Register of Historic Places on August 12, 1988.

Images

References

Historic districts on the National Register of Historic Places in Illinois
Buildings and structures in Bloomington–Normal
National Register of Historic Places in McLean County, Illinois
Houses on the National Register of Historic Places in Illinois
Houses in McLean County, Illinois